Dublin is an unincorporated community in Graves County, Kentucky, United States. It was named after the city of Dublin in Ireland.

References

Unincorporated communities in Graves County, Kentucky
Unincorporated communities in Kentucky
Irish-American culture in Kentucky